Onychognathiidae is a family of worms belonging to the order Bursovaginoidea.

Genera:
 Goannagnathia Sterrer, 2001
 Nanognathia Sterrer, 1972
 Onychognathia Riedl, 1971
 Valvognathia Kristensen & Nørrevang, 1978
 Vampyrognathia Sterrer, 1998

References

Gnathostomulida
Platyzoa families